Emile the African (French: Émile l'Africain) is a 1949 French comedy film directed by Robert Vernay and starring Fernandel, Alexandre Rignault and  Noëlle Norman.

Cast
 Fernandel as Émile Boulard  
 Alexandre Rignault as Ladislas Stany  
 Noëlle Norman as Suzanne Boulard  
 Félix Oudart as Romi 
 Bernard La Jarrige as Daniel Cormier  
 Roland Armontel as Dibier 
 Jacqueline Dor as Martine Boulard  
 Madeleine Lambert as Madame Cormier  
 Jean Hébey as Le clerc de notaire  
 Line Dariel as Madame Zulma  
 Missia as La chanteuse  
 Henri Coutet as L'acteur  
 André Marnay as Le notaire  
 Pierre Labry as Le patron  
 Sylvain as Un machiniste  
 Janine Viénot as L'actrice  
 Palmyre Levasseur as L'habilleuse  
 Émile Riandreys 
 Eugène Compain 
 Marcel Meral 
 Georges Sellier
 Albert Broquin as Un figurant  
 Lud Germain as Bimbo

References

Bibliography 
 James Monaco. The Encyclopedia of Film. Perigee Books, 1991.

External links 
 

1949 films
1949 comedy films
French comedy films
1940s French-language films
Films directed by Robert Vernay
French black-and-white films
1940s French films